Roy Eugene Baldwin, Jr. (born August 9, 1948)  is a Republican former member of the Pennsylvania House of Representatives and father of The Bachelor star Andrew Baldwin.

Baldwin earned a degree in Agricultural Engineering from Cornell University. He served as Township Supervisor of Manheim Township, Lancaster County, Pennsylvania for eight years. He was first elected to represent the 97th legislative district in the Pennsylvania House of Representatives in the 2002 election when he defeated upset Republican incumbent Jere L. Strittmatter in the Republican primary.
Baldwin has two brothers:Robert and Bill and a sister, Mary Baldwin Costello. He married Cynthia "Cindy" Laulani, a mathematics teacher. He has three children, two sons: Andy Baldwin, US Naval Officer, athlete and physician who starred in the reality show The Bachelor, Rob and a daughter Susie Baldwin.

References

External links
 official PA House profile (archived)
 official Party website (archived)

1948 births
Living people
Republican Party members of the Pennsylvania House of Representatives
American management consultants
People from Lancaster County, Pennsylvania
Engineers from Pennsylvania
Cornell University College of Agriculture and Life Sciences alumni